Finnkino Oy is a Finnish film distributor and the biggest cinema chain in Finland. It was established in 1986 as a union of 34 companies working in the film industry. In 1994, Finnkino was acquired by the Rautakirja Group, which became a division of the Sanoma Group in 1999. Finnkino operates a total of 16 cinemas in eleven cities. It also has subsidiaries in Latvia, Lithuania and Estonia, operated under the names of Forum Cinemas and Forum Distribution. In early 2017, Finnkino and other Scandinavian and Baltic cinema chains were acquired by AMC Theatres as part of its acquisition of Nordic Cinema Group.

Finnkino's biggest movie theatre multiplex is Tennispalatsi in Helsinki and its headquarters are located in Ruskeasuo, Helsinki.

In 2006, Finnkino took over Finnish theatrical distribution for films by United International Pictures' partner studios, Paramount Pictures (including films by DreamWorks) and Universal Pictures, after UIP decided to move its Finnish distribution base from Buena Vista International for several years.

Theatres 
As of 2021, Finnkino runs a total of sixteen different multiplex movie theaters in eleven Finnish cities:

References

External links
 Official homepage

Film distributors
Cinema chains in Finland

AMC Theatres